Proinsias Ó Doibhlin, O.F.M. (1660–1724) was an Irish Franciscan friar, poet and scribe, who died c. 1724.

Biography
Possibly from Muinterevlin (now Ardboe), Ó Doibhlin was a prominent member of the Franciscan community at the Irish College(College of the Immaculate Conception) in Prague where he lectured in philosophy in 1697, where he remained as late as 1712. By 1714 he had returned to Ireland where he had become the Guardian of the Dungannon/Donaghmore Franciscan house; in 1717 he was transferred to Drogheda but was back as Guardian at Dungannon in 1720.

In 1724 he was appointed by the Franciscans as confessor to the Poor Clares in Dublin and seems to have died shortly afterward.

He is the author of a poem, Gach croiceann libh dar feannadh (Every skin you have fleeced), criticising Gearóid Mac Con Míde for the latters apparent slurs on the O'Neills of Tyrone. Composed sometime between 1716 and 1718, it was known among members of Tadhg Ó Neachtain's literary circle, as a letter survives from Seon Mac Solaidh to Richard Tipper where Mac Solaidh asks for a copy of the poem.

Gach croiceann libh dar feannadh remains the only piece in Irish which can be ascribed to Ó Doibhlin.

See also
Liam Inglis
Tadhg Ó Neachtain

References
Diarmaid Ó Doibhlin (2000) Tyrone's Gaelic Literary Legacy in Tyrone: History and Society, pp. 424–25.

External links
Gleanings from Irish manuscripts, National Library of Scotland

17th-century births
1724 deaths
People from County Tyrone
Irish Friars Minor
17th-century Irish Roman Catholic priests
18th-century Irish Roman Catholic priests
17th-century Irish writers
18th-century Irish poets
Irish-language poets